Fawaz Hussain or Fawaz Husên (born 1953), is a contemporary Kurdish writer and translator. He was born in northeastern Syria. He pursued his studies in Sorbonne from 1978 to 1992, and received PhD in French language and literature in 1988. He is a member of Swedish Writers' Union and French Writers' Syndicate. In addition to Kurdish, he has written several books in French and has translated works of Albert Camus and Saint-Exupéry into Kurdish.

Books
Siwarên êsê, Novel, 111 pp., Welat Publishers, Stockholm, 1994.  
Le Fleuve, Short Story in French, Méréalê Publishers, Paris, 1997. Réédition. Le Rocher/Le Serpent à Plumes/ Motifs.
Dîroka edebiyata Fransî : sedsala hivdehan û hijdehan, (History of French Literature), 151 pp.,  Apec Publishers, 1998. 
Chroniques boréales. Short story in French, L’Harmattan Publishers, Paris, 2000.
Amîdabad,  Short story, 106 pp., Avesta Publishers, Istanbul, 2002. 
Prof dans une ZEP ordinaire, 285 pp., Paris, 2006. 
Les Sables de Mésopotamie, 312 pp. Paris, Rocher Publishers, 2007. 
En direction du vent, 112 pp. Paris, Non Lieu Publishers, 2010, 
Parîsabad. Istanbul. Avesta, 2010. 
 Barê Sevê. Istanbul, Avesta, 2012. 
 La prophétie d'Abouna. publisher Ginkgo Editeur, Paris, 2013. 
 Orages pèlerins, éditions du Serpent à Plumes, juin 2016. 172 pages. 
 Les Sables de Mésopotamie, éditions Points, novembre 2016. 288 pages. 
 Le Rêveur des bords du Tigre, éditions Les Escales, 2017. 172 pages. 
 Le Syrien du septième étage, éditions Le Serpent à Plumes, 2018, 231 pages. 
 Le Kurde qui regardait passer les nuages, éditions Zinédi, 2019, 115 pages. 
 Murcie, sur les pas d'Ibn Arabi, éditions du Jasmin, 2020, 138 pages.
 A mon père, mon repère, éditions du Jasmin, 2021, 205 pages.

Translations
Biyanî, Translation of L’Étranger by Albert Camus, Stockholm, Nûdem Publishers, Stockholm, 1995. 
Mîrzayê Piçûk, Translation of Le Petit Prince by Antoine de Saint-Exupéry, Nûdem Publishers, Stockholm, 1995. 
La Poursuite de l'ombre, Translation of Siya Evînê by Mehmed Uzun into French, 248 pp., Phébus Publishers, Paris, 1999.   
Kurdên Haymanayê, Translation of Les Kurdes de L'Haïmaneh by Georges Perrot into Kurdish, 111 pp., Apec Publishers, Sweden, 2000. 
Mesa bi serhiskî û Agirê koçer. Translation av Gérard Chaliand book Marche têtue et Feu nomade. Istanbul. Avesta, 2005.  
Mîrzayê Piçûk. New translation of "Le Petit Prince" by Antoine de Saint-Exupéry. Istanbul, Avesta, 2011.
 Biyanî. Albert Camus L'Etranger. Istanbul, Avesta, 2012. 
Le Promeneur d'Alep. Niroz Malek. Traduit de l'arabe (Syrie), Le Serpent à Plumes, 2015. .
 Les Anciennes Nuits. Niroz Malek. Traduit de l'arabe (Syrie), Le Serpent à Plumes, 2017. 363 pages. 
 Mêrê ku kevir bilind dikirin, Mêrê bi guhê jêkirî, Mêrê ku ti$tekî wî nebû, Her sê $ekir û her sê gunehên mezin, quatre titres de Jean-Claude Mourlevat traduits en kurde.Istanbul, éditions Avesta, .

References

External links
Fawaz Hussain , Immigrant Institute, Sweden. (in Swedish)

Kurdish-language writers
1953 births
University of Paris alumni
Living people